Myrtlewood can refer to:

The town of Myrtlewood, Alabama
The wood of Myrtus in the Mediterranean region
The wood of Umbellularia in California and Oregon
Myrtlewood (horse), American Thoroughbred racehorse

pt:Myrtlewood